Damien Hooper (born 5 February 1992) is an Indigenous Australian professional boxer. As an amateur he was selected to represent Australia at the 2012 Summer Olympics in the light-heavyweight division.

Early life
Hooper was raised by his grandmother, Lillian Weribone, in a Dalby Queensland, Australia. Hooper began boxing at the age of eleven with older brother Troy Hooper. He was in trouble with the law and the local policeman there named Chris Seng had been a pro boxer. He ran the police citizens youth club and suggested that hooper take up boxing.

Amateur
In 2010, he became the first Indigenous Australian to win a junior world title when he won the 75 kg category at the Youth Olympics in Singapore. In the same year, he won a silver medal at the Youth World Championships in Baku, Azerbaijan, and was selected in the Australian team for the 2010 Commonwealth Games in New Delhi. He was an Australian Institute of Sport boxing scholarship holder.

The following year, Hooper stepped up a weight division and into open competition. He returned to Baku for the 2011 World Amateur Boxing Championships – Light heavyweight 2011 World Amateur Boxing Championships, where he made the quarter finals, being edged out by Julio César La Cruz 13:14 and earned direct qualification for the London Olympics. In the last of his 180 amateur fights,

2012 London Summer Olympics

At the 2012 London Summer Olympics, he beat Marcus Browne then he lost on points to 81 kg gold medallist Egor Mekhontsev of Russia.

Professional boxing
Before he made his debut in 2013, Hooper signed with Ricky Hatton's Hatton Promotions by 2014 he had 9-0 8KO. Then momentum in Hooper's promising professional career stalled, with the Olympians loss to Rob Powdrill in November 2014 then in 2015 he lost his professional deal with Ricky Hatton's promotional company, He is now with No Limit Boxing. He is currently ranked number 1 Australian light heavyweight and 9th on the WBO Light-Heavyweight rankings.

Hooper vs. Umar Salamov

2017 Hooper (12-1, 8KO) took on unbeaten Russian Umar Salamov (19-0, 14KO) on the undercard to the Pacquiao v Horn blockbuster and got a unanimous decision 96–94 on all three judges score cards to win the WBO International light heavyweight title and vacant IBF International light heavyweight title improving his record to 13-1 8KO.

Hooper vs. Renold Quinlan

In a wild bitter rivalry, he took on hard hitting fellow aussie super middleweight Renold Quinlan Hooper controlled the early action with his long jab and occasional right crosses but the balance of the fight changed in the 5th hooper was down twice but recovered and regained control in the eighth to earn a TKO win over Quinlan at 2min 19sec of the ninth round to move his record to (14-1, 9KO).

Professional boxing record

Personal life
Hooper's older brother Troy died in 2012 in a workplace accident, two months after he fought at the London Olympics.
He traces his Indigenous family ancestry to the Kamilaroi people.

Controversy
On 30 July, in London at the 2012 Summer Olympics, Hooper stepped into the ring for his Olympic bout wearing a T-shirt emblazoned with the Australian Aboriginal flag: the same flag now approved to fly on public buildings in Australia. The Australian Olympic Committee demanded he make a public apology. Wearing the shirt was said to have breached the Olympic Charter. "I'm representing my culture, not only my country", said Hooper. "I'm proud of what I did."

References 

1992 births
Living people
Australian Institute of Sport boxers
Australian male boxers
Boxers at the 2010 Commonwealth Games
Boxers at the 2010 Summer Youth Olympics
Boxers at the 2012 Summer Olympics
Commonwealth Games competitors for Australia
Gamilaraay
Indigenous Australian boxers
Indigenous Australian Olympians
Light-heavyweight boxers
Olympic boxers of Australia
Sportspeople from Toowoomba
Youth Olympic gold medalists for Australia